Juan Ignacio Gilardi (born 14 November 1981) is an Argentine retired field hockey player who played as a defender for the Argentine national team.

He was part of the Argentine team that won gold in men's field hockey at the 2016 Summer Olympics in Rio de Janeiro. Although Gilardi would have liked to have continued playing for the national team in 2019, the head coach Germán Orozco, told him he would not be selected for the national team anymore. So the 2018 World Cup was his last tournament for the national team.

References

External links

1981 births
Living people
Male field hockey defenders
Argentine people of Italian descent
Argentine male field hockey players
Olympic field hockey players of Argentina
Field hockey players at the 2007 Pan American Games
2014 Men's Hockey World Cup players
Field hockey players at the 2015 Pan American Games
Field hockey players at the 2016 Summer Olympics
2018 Men's Hockey World Cup players
Olympic medalists in field hockey
Medalists at the 2016 Summer Olympics
Olympic gold medalists for Argentina
South American Games gold medalists for Argentina
South American Games medalists in field hockey
Pan American Games gold medalists for Argentina
Pan American Games silver medalists for Argentina
Pan American Games medalists in field hockey
Competitors at the 2014 South American Games
People from San Fernando de la Buena Vista
Medalists at the 2007 Pan American Games
Medalists at the 2015 Pan American Games
Sportspeople from Buenos Aires Province